Četnické humoresky is a Czech crime television series about a gendarmerie investigative unit, stationed in the city of Brno. The story is set in the period of interbellic First Czechoslovak Republic and combines elements of crime drama and comedy. The stories are based on real case files from that era.

The series was directed by Antonín Moskalyk and later by his daughter Pavlína Moskalyková Solo. One of the goals of the series producers and showrunners was to show the life of Czechoslovak gendarmes. The series is not entirely focused on law enforcement and criminal investigations; it also shows private lives of the gendarmerie officers. The series ran for 3 seasons, totaling 39 episodes.

Cast

Tomáš Töpfer as Karel Arazím, the Senior Sergeant of the station, later Chief constable
Ivan Trojan as Bedřich Jarý, Arazím's loyal right-hand man
Zdeněk Junák as Josef Ambrož, Chief Warrant Officer 
Jan Apolenář as Václav Ryba, handler
Oldřich Mikulášek as František Řepa, sergeant, porter
Erik Pardus as František Zahálka, sergeant
František Švihlík as Čeněk Němec, staff Sergeant later Warrant
Aleš Jarý as Sláva Jiroušek, staff Sergeant, driver, later shot dead
Stanislav Zindulka as Jan Turko, Warrant, later in retirement
Viktor Preiss as Leopold Skčílek, Warrant 
Petr Kostka as Jaroslav Šiktanc, Chief constable, later in retirement
Zdena Herfortová as Vladěnka Šiktancová, wife Chief constable Šiktanc
Alena Antalová as Ludmila Horká, Arazím's girlfriend, later his wife
Libuše Šafránková as Karlička Formánková, Nurse, Arazím's girlfriend 
Olga Krasko as Klaudie, Arazím's daughter, Bedřich Jarý's wife
Tatiana Vilhelmová as Kamila Kliková, pushy and ambitious journalist
Miroslav Donutil as Hugo Líbal, photographer and owner of photo studio
Dana Batulková as Jindřiška Patová, seamstress and owner of fashion store, lover Sláva Jiroušek
Ivana Vaňková as Elly Vienna, opera singer
Andrea Elsnerová as Anděla Rybová, Cook
Vlasta Peterková as Božena, Cook, later wife Čeněk Němec
František Černín as Ondřej Formánek, Karlička's Son
Luděk Munzar as Judr. Peřina, Karliška's Father
Věra Galatíková as Anna Peřinová, Karlička's Mother
Marek Vašut as Kylián Pádlo, Ministry of the Interior (Czechoslovakia)
Carmen Mayerová as Vendula Chromáková, Housewife at Karel and Ludmila
Ivan G'Vera as Joseph McGregor, Ludmila's brother
and more

Episodes

References

External links 

Czech crime television series
2001 Czech television series debuts
Czech Television original programming
2007 Czech television series endings